Kristýna Plíšková was the defending champion, but chose to participate at the 2011 Sparta Prague Open instead. 
Rika Fujiwara defeated Monique Adamczak in the final 6–3, 6–1.

Seeds

Draw

Finals

Top half

Bottom half

References
Main Draw
Qualifying Singles

Kurume Best Amenity International Women's Tennis - Singles
Kurume Best Amenity Cup